St. Robert's School is a higher secondary school for boys, which is situated in the green milieu of Darjeeling Hill Station, West Bengal, India. It is affiliated with the West Bengal Board of Secondary Education and the West Bengal Council of Higher Secondary Education. The government-aided school is administered by the Roman Catholic Diocese of Darjeeling and is under the religious jurisdiction of the Roman Catholic Bishop of Darjeeling.

The school aims at the education of the Catholic community in and around Darjeeling while extending its service to members of other communities too. St. Robert's School Higher Secondary school stands for academic excellence, development of skills, and character formation with the view of educating the citizens remarkable for all-around development and sincere commitment to God and the country.

Catholic education is inspired by a vision of the world drawn from the life and teachings of Jesus Christ, whose teachings have always been respected and admired. The vision and principles give Catholic institutions a specific character and set before their staff and students high ideals of humanism and service towards which they are invited continually to strive.

St. Robert's Higher Secondary School aims at the integral, personal formation of the young. To accomplish this, special efforts are made to help the students become mature, spiritually oriented men of character; to encourage them continually to strive after excellence in every field; to value and judiciously use their freedom; to be clear and firm on principles and courageous in action; to be selfless in the service towards the society and to become agents of social change in their country.

The school thus aims at making its contribution towards a radical transformation of present-day social condition so that the principles of social justice, equality of opportunities, genuine freedom, respect for religious and moral values enshrined in the Constitution of India may prevail and so the possibility of living a fully human existence may be open before all.

History
"The birth of the present St. Robert's High School was literally an earth-shaking event! Just as it was starting its new life in Caroline Villa at the beginning of 1934, the still remembered earthquake of January 15 practically demolished the Villa. St. Robert's was homeless even as it saw the light of the day." - Late Rev. Fr. W. Bourke, S.J.

The school began shortly before December 1933 when Fr. G. Ruwet, S.J. was appointed by the Jesuit Superior to open a new school in Darjeeling for local boys. AS soon as he came to the Bishop's House from North Point in January 1934, he, together with Fr. Edmond van Tichelen, S.J., the parish priest, began looking for a school building. Caroline Villa was made available by one Mr. Koko Mackertich, a wealthy Armenian businessman of Calcutta, and a lease was about to be signed when the infamous disaster struck in the whole of North-East India. The Municipality condemned Caroline Villa as its premises were no more safe. 

Despite the setback, the priests secured the Halcyon House, near the Mall, with an arrangement made with Mr. Graham Hardy for Rs.150/- per month. The event was followed by the renovation of the Halcyon House which led to a delay in the commencement of the academic year. The delay over repairs seem to have given St. Robert's several 'opening' dates. According to the school diary for the said academic year, the school 'opened' on February 5, and then the classes were adjourned for fifteen days. The 'official' opening, however, took place on February 19 at the top floor of the present day Bishop's House, in the garret which later served as the residence of the School Headmaster.

The new school in Halcyon House that started for classes one to eight is known to have a total of two hundred and one boys. The influx of more students led the fathers to look for more spacious accommodation. The then school diary accounts for the placement of a new sign board, bearing the name "St. Robert's School", on the roof of Halcyon House, on April 2, 1934. The new institution was placed under the care and patronage of a scholar of the 17th century, who had been recently canonized a Jesuit saint.

Progress soon developed when the District Inspector of Schools, Mr. M. M. Rahman inspected the Halcyon House premises prior to its recognition as a Middle English School for two years, starting January 1, 1934. Meanwhile, yet another location was being prepared for the institution at Sunny Bank.

On May 2, the lease for the well-known Park Hotel was bought by the Archbishop of Calcutta, His Grace Ferdinand Perier, S.J., and the building and property were made available to Fr. Ruwet for the new school. Pictures taken on July 17, 1934 account for the events that took place on the last day at Halcyon House. The diary describes the scene as follows:
"All the boys went to Halcyon House for the last time. The school board was removed from the roof. Then a procession was formed: (1) the School Coat-of-Arms - Ad Maiora: (2) the Sign Board: (3) the Park Hotel rickshaw with the picture of the Sacred Heart adorned with Flowers: (4) the boys: (5) the staff. The boys were cheering all the way. When leaving Halcyon House they gave three cheers - three were also given before entering the Park Hotel. Then photographs were taken." 

The first classes were held the day before, when all the furniture was brought to Sunny Bank.

The grounds of Sunny Bank have been known to host at least three seminaries (training institutions for candidates to priesthood) and many schools. The ebb and flow of institutions imparting boys' education in Darjeeling is another story that deserves a chapter in the history of Education in Darjeeling. However, it is known from the records that St. Robert's almost never had a beginning. The then District Commissioner of Darjeeling was against the establishment of the institution with the plea that there was no need for two boys' high schools in the town. Archbishop Ferdinand Perier, SJ, DD of Calcutta and the Jesuit Superior tended to the opinion that there should be only one high school in the hills run by the Jesuits, at Kurseong, that is, St. Alphonsus High School. Nonetheless, a decision was made to maintain two high schools, St. Alphonsus and St. Robert's, with a single hostel - Bellarmine Hall (1957–1979), at Kurseong. Thus, Fr. Ruwet, S.J. embarked on a new journey of starting St. Robert's in the January of 1934. 

The school faced its share of problems right since its days of growth. The first was the problem of recognition; this came shortly after the District Inspector of Schools, Mr. M. M. Rahman, inspected the institution when it was still in the Halcyon House. Recognition as a ME school was granted for two years, starting 1 January 1934. Then, in September 1935, St. Robert's was recognized as a HE school, which again was for two years.

The school's first headmaster, Major A. J. Dewan and Fr. Ruwet foresaw the upgrade of St.Robert's to a High School, and in 1935 began class nine as the first step. In 1936, class ten was added, and in 1937, the first three candidates for matriculation examination were sent up. Two of them, Nandalall Sing Theeng (Div. 1) and Pahal Singh Theeng (Div. 2), passed, and head the list of thousands for generations to come. No much had passed when Major Dewan left for a course in Calcutta. Mr. John Gomes was then made the headmaster (1935), with Mr. Kala Pradhan, B.Sc., as assistant headmaster, while Fr. G. Ruwet, S.J. was the principal.

The school suffered immense difficulties when young men left school to join the army during the war (1939-1945). But after the war, there was a rush for admissions and the school flourished in phenomenal ways. The National Cadet Corps (NCC) Troops of St. Robert's School was recognized in 1957. Later, around the early 1963, the primary section of the school was phased out to make room for the new higher secondary system of high school. From 01.01.63 to 31.12.1975, this system, with eleven years of schooling, formed a whole generation of graduates, and a decision of replacing the old Park Hotel building with a new structure to cater to the increased enrollment was made.

In 1962, Father Mackey had arranged a new wing to the old building to provide laboratory facilities. However, this was not enough to lighten the load on the crowded classrooms. Thus, in 1986, Fr. Leo Forestell, S.J. guided the institution to the decision to undertake a major face-lift of Sunny Bank. First finances had to be found for the project, for which Fr. McGuire, S.J. spent a full year in Canada to find supporters. At the same time, the Canadian Government promised support to the tune of $90,000.00 (about 7 lakhs INR). Rs. 5,000/- were raised by the students, and (this amount together with) their labour in the construction of the foundations (popular among the students as "balti" class) remain a gift to future generation of young men looking for a better education. By 1974, the long work was completed, a souvenir booklet brought out for the occasion by the editor, Mr. J.K. Chettri, M.A., B.T., and today St. Robert's school building stands tall and proud in the heart of Darjeeling town.

School system 
The school imparts education from Class V onwards, all the way to Class XII, and each of the classes till Class X is segregated into four sections. The classes of XI and XII are segregated into two sections for students studying the streams of Humanities and Science. Additionally, the school hosts four houses, each named after the locally found floral species of the Darjeeling Hills to signify different attributes the students inculcate during the duration of their stay as the students of the institution:

Magnolia House (Blue) representing consistency, sincerity, and devotion.
Rhododendron House (Red) representing courage, strength, and passion. 
Marigold House (Yellow) representing purity, truth, and perseverance.
Ochid House (Green) representing rejuvenation, humility, and brilliance.

Each of the houses is led and represented by its respective House Captain chosen by the School Committee in view of all the attributes and skills that the student possesses. In addition to the House Captains, the school hosts a group of captains, led by the School Captain (Head Boy) appointed based on leadership skills, academic skills, interpersonal skills, and sportsmanship. These captains help the faculties in the coordination and functionality of the school in an efficient and orderly fashion, while also helping to bridge the gap between the students and the faculty.

The school also houses different clubs for the overall development of the students via different extra-curricular activities. These clubs are Nature Club, Numismatics Club, Readers Club, etc. Additionally, the school also hosts the National Cadet Corps (NCC) with the aim to channelize the youth energy of the students through military vibrant feelings in a positive manner, all with the objective of making India a great nation.

Headmasters
 Major Augustine J. Dewan (1934 - 1935)
 Mr. John Gomes (1935 - .... )
 Fr. R.V.D. Abeele (1939)
 Fr. Joseph Arimont, SJ (1940 - 1949)
 Fr. John Prendergast, SJ (1950 - 1958)
 Fr. William Mackey, SJ (1959 - 1962)
 Fr. John Prendergast, SJ (1963 - 1964)
 Fr. Francis Farrell, SJ (1964 - 1966)
 Fr. John Prendergast, SJ (1967)
 Fr. James McCabe, SJ (Acting HM, 1967)
 Fr. Leo Forestell, SJ (1968 - 1976)
 Fr. Anthony Sharma (1977 - 1980) 
 Fr. William Bourke, SJ (1980 - 1990)
 Fr. Valerian Viegas (1990 - 2012) 
 Fr. Peter Lingdamo (2013 - 2018)
 Fr. Micheal Singh (2018–present)

Notable alumni
 Dr Sanduk Ruit Ophthalmologist.
 Bhim Bahadur Gurung Former Chief Minister, Sikkim.
 Indra Bahadur Rai Nepali writer.
 Uday Sotang Singer, writer.
 Prashant Tamang Winner, Indian Idol Season 3, singer, actor.

Recognition and accolades
 Sera Vidhyalaya Award, 2019 Awarded by the Chief Minister of West Bengal, Smt. Mamata Banerjee

See also
Education in India
List of schools in India
Education in West Bengal

References

External links
 Official SRS Facebook page

Boys' schools in India
Christian schools in West Bengal
High schools and secondary schools in West Bengal
Schools in Darjeeling district
Education in Darjeeling
Educational institutions established in 1934
1934 establishments in India